Bhavesh Joshi Superhero is a 2018 Indian Hindi-language vigilante action drama film directed by Vikramaditya Motwane under Phantom Films banner and co-written by Motwane along with Anurag Kashyap and Abhay Koranne. It stars Harshvardhan Kapoor in the lead role along with Priyanshu Painyuli, Ashish Verma and Nishikant Kamat in the supporting roles. The film revolves around a successful vigilante group that fades away with time but resurfaces when one of its members discovers the theft of water by a local politician. This was Kamat's posthumous appearance before his death on 17 August 2020.

Bhavesh Joshi Superhero released theatrically on 1 June 2018, and was also screened at Neuchatel Film Festival. The film received generally positive reviews and became a box-office bomb grossing 4.35 crore on a budget of 21 crore.

Plot
Bhavesh Joshi, Sikandar "Siku" Khanna and Rajat are three young men, who meet in an anti-corruption rally and become friends. They later come up with a YouTube channel Insaaf TV, creating an online show about justice and trying to show the people about the common wrongdoings and corruption which are rampant in the city. Initially, their show garners success, where they wear paper-bag masks and help to solve or confront some small scale corruptions in and around their neighborhood. Time goes by; Siku and Rajat get jobs at the corporate sector after  completing their graduation. Their interest for Insaaf TV gradually fades out except for Bhavesh, who gets obsessed about eradicating corruption from society and continues with his vigilante acts, despite a fall in their channel viewership. 

Bhavesh receives an email from an elderly citizen about water problems existing in and around his locality and starts investigating the case. Bhavesh discovers that the water pipes across the city meant for delivering water to the households have been fitted with extra pipes to siphon out water to water tankers which are then delivered to the various neighborhoods making people buy the same water which they were supposed to receive for free from the municipality. Bhavesh leaks this news to his channel, and this results in the water crime syndicate leader Patil, who is responsible for this act, to order a manhunt to look into the true identity of the masked man behind Insaaf TV.

Meanwhile, despite providing all the proper documents and doing multiple follow ups with the local police station, Siku's police clearance for his VISA processing to move to the US doesn't get approved, until he pays a bribe to the police officials to get the things done. Bhavesh becomes furious knowing this, and they initially get into a verbal argument. An enraged Bhavesh tells that all the government officials and politicians are corrupt and should be eradicated to cleanse the society with Siku recording his dialogues on his phone. Bhavesh later punches Siku, breaking his nose. An enraged Siku uploads the video on the Insaaf TV channel. 

Soon, Bhavesh is termed by the media as national fugitive and is beaten by an angry mob and also arrested by the police and his identity gets exposed to Patil, who warns him; desperate to prove his innocence and uncover the truth to people, Bhavesh sets out to gather evidence despite being injured. He gets caught in the process and Patil beats him to death. The police hand over his body to Siku for last rites claiming it to be a road accident, and further warn him not to get involved into this. Blaming himself for Bhavesh's death, Siku tricks the police into believing that he has left for US and takes refuge in an abandoned hotel which previously served as a safe house for their gang. He sets out covering his face in a mask and inadvertently blows up Patil's pump house, where he used to fill the siphoned water to the water trailers. 

It is then revealed that Patil has backing from the local minister named Rana. Siku gets himself a new vigilante costume, buys a motorcycle, customizes it by fitting nitro cylinders and interrogates government officer Subhash Mhatre who reveals that Bhavesh was killed by Patil as he was about to uncover his illegal water supply activities. A fight breaks out between him and Mhatre's men during the interrogation, and a nearly defeated Siku is saved by Bhavesh's martial arts trainer. Siku posts his interrogation video in Justice TV and reveals that he himself as the still-alive Bhavesh Joshi and also starts learning martial arts and other combat skills from the martial arts trainer.

As the video goes viral, Patil gets arrested by the police. However, Mhatre gets killed, with police claiming it to be a suicide and Patil is released due to a lack of evidence. Siku disguises himself and visits the dance bar which Patil visits every night. He plants a bug in Patil's VIP room and gets to know that he is planning to blow up the water pipes across the city to create an acute shortage of drinking water. However, police inspector Sunil Jadhav discovers him in the bar one night, and after a long drawn-out motorcycle chase, Siku escapes, causing an angered Patil to kill a constable and forcing police to frame Bhavesh for the constable's death.

Suspicious about who is behind Justice TV after Bhavesh's demise, Rajat spies on Siku's girlfriend, Sneha and discovers that Siku is still in India and has assumed Bhavesh's identity.When Siku goes home, Rajat confronts him. He says to him about the risks of his vigilantistic actions and how it could endanger his loved ones including him (Rajat), so Siku tells him "So join me, in this war for justice" . Siku arrives at the place targeted by Patil's men and fights them, later being defeated and unmasked in the process. They succeed in their mission of blowing up the water pipes with a wounded Siku watching in vain. Patil and Rana tell Inspector Jadhav to kill Siku and dump his body in water, thus blaming Bhavesh for this act against Mumbai. 

Jadhav hesitantly shoots and injures Siku. Rajat follows Siku and captures everything on camera. Once Siku is thrown into the water, Rajat rescues him and takes him to a hospital. However, Siku suggests him to let people think that he's dead and so Rajat admits him to the hospital under a fake name. As Siku recovers, Mumbai suffers from the acute drinking water crisis. Rana meets the CM and tells him that he can arrange for water free of cost but instead should get the contracts of all future water related projects. Everyone gets drinking water for free, and both the CM and Rana become heroes in common people's eyes.

Rajat delivers the video of that night to Jadhav via a kid and forces him to open an investigation about the blast. As the true news spreads across the city, Bhavesh starts gaining support and protests begin everywhere. One night, Siku infiltrates Rana's house; Rana comes down, sees all his bodyguards knocked out and encounters Insaaf-Man (based on Rajat's graphic novel) at the balcony.

Cast
 Harshvardhan Kapoor as Sikandar "Siku" Khanna / Bhavesh Joshi / Insaaf-Man
 Priyanshu Painyuli as Bhavesh Joshi
 Ashish Verma as Rajat
 Shreiyah Sabharwal as Sneha  
 Pratap Phad as Patil
 Pabitra Rabha as Thapa
 Chinmay Mandlekar as Sunil Jadhav (credited as Chinmayee Mandlekar)
 Nishikant Kamat as Rana 
 Hrishikesh Joshi as Subhash Mhatre

Special appearances 
 Arjun Kapoor in the song "Chavanprash"

Production

Development
The film was officially announced sometime in April 2014. The title of the film was said to be Bhavesh Joshi.

Casting
The makers of the film initially decided on Imran Khan for the lead. The role then went to Sidharth Malhotra, but he was eventually replaced by Harshvardhan Kapoor due to frequent delays in the film's pre-production schedule.

Filming
The principal photography of the film commenced in July 2016. The film shooting ended on 30 May 2017

Music

The music of the film was composed by  Amit Trivedi while the lyrics were written by Amitabh Bhattacharya, Anurag Kashyap, Babu Haabi and Naezy. The first song of the film to be released was Hum Hain Insaaf which is sung by Babu Haabi and Naezy and was released on 12 May 2018. The second song of the film titled as Chavanprash featuring Arjun Kapoor, sung by Divya Kumar, Pragati Joshi and Arohi Mhatre, was re-released on 16 May 2018. The soundtrack of the film was released on 23 May 2018 by Eros Music.

Release
Official teaser trailer for the film was released on 18 April 2018.
The official trailer was released on May 2. The film released theatrically on 1 June 2018. It was also officially selected for the 2018 Bucheon International Fantastic Film Festival. The film made it to Netflix along with Vikramaditya Motwane's debut film, Udaan.

Reception

Critical response
Neil Soans of The Times of India praised the central theme of the film and the acting performances with a special mention for Priyanshu Painyuli and gave the film a rating of 3.5 out of 5. Raja Sen of NDTV said that the film has good intentions and is filled with praiseworthy acting performances but the screenplay lacks originality and is not strong enough to make the film an interesting watch. Rajeev Masand of News18 was impressed with the concept of the film, the acting performances and the music by Amit Trivedi but was critical of the poorly written script and gave the film a rating of 2.5 out of 5. Rohit Vats of Hindustan Times appreciated director Vikramaditya Motwane for making a film which is unlike any other super hero film made in India, but criticized the film for its long length and poor editing and gave the film a rating of 3 out of 5. Shubhra Gupta of The Indian Express gave the film a rating of 2 out of 5 saying that the film has some good acting performances but suffers from poor editing and an inconsistent screenplay.

References

External links
 
 

2010s Hindi-language films
2010s Indian superhero films
2010s vigilante films
2018 action drama films
2018 martial arts films
Films set in Mumbai
Films scored by Amit Trivedi
Indian action drama films
Indian vigilante films
Film superheroes
Indian martial arts films
Films about freedom of expression
Films about friendship
Films about revolutions
Reliance Entertainment films
Fiction about government
Films about water
Films about social issues in India
Films with screenplays by Anurag Kashyap
Indian superhero films